Alexander Viktorovich Masalov (Yelagin)  (born 2 August 1953, Moscow) is a Russian sports commentator, presenter and actor.

Biography 
Alexander Yelagin was born in 1953. He graduated from the International Office MSU Faculty of Journalism. After graduation, he worked in Goznak, as well as in Czechoslovakia through the Society for Friendship with Foreign Countries.

Acting career began at the Student Theater of Moscow State University under the direction of Roman Viktyuk in 1975. Upon returning from Czechoslovakia he worked in the  Theater Nikitsky Gate   (since 1989, with interruptions).

In the 1990s, he worked on a 2x2 television channel and posted ads on the radio station Echo of Moscow.

Since 1997 he worked in the sports version of the television Ren-TV

After retiring from Ren-TV he worked as a sports commentator on the Seven TV, Russia-2 and NTV Plus.

Since November 2015 – commentator on football broadcasts on Match TV. In January 2016, together with a number of prominent commentators were placed in state television and translated into fee-basis.

Since March 2016 to present – football commentator on Eurosport television channel.

Author of several books and reference books on the history of football

References

External links
 Гонщик Андронов, "аммиачный" Генич и почтальон Елагин. Российские телекомментаторы. Кто они?
   Александр Елагин: «Когда в 90-е тебе показывали английский футбол, можно было слететь с катушек»

1953 births
Living people
Russian association football commentators
Association football commentators
Sports commentators
Russian sports journalists
Sportspeople from Moscow
Male actors from Moscow
Soviet male actors
Russian male actors
Moscow State University alumni
Honored Artists of the Russian Federation
Russian YouTubers